The Texas House of Representatives is the lower house of the bicameral Texas Legislature. It consists of 150 members who are elected from single-member districts for two-year terms. As of the 2010 United States census, each member represents about 167,637 people. There are no term limits. The House meets at the State Capitol in Austin.

Leadership

The Speaker of the House is the presiding officer and highest-ranking member of the House. The Speaker's duties include maintaining order within the House, recognizing members during debate, ruling on procedural matters, appointing members to the various committees and sending bills for committee review. The Speaker pro tempore is primarily a ceremonial position, but does, by long-standing tradition, preside over the House during its consideration of local and consent bills.

Unlike other state legislatures, the House rules do not formally recognize majority or minority leaders. The unofficial leaders are the Republican Caucus Chairman and the Democratic House Leader, both of whom are elected by their respective caucuses.

Composition

List of current representatives

Notable past members
 Eligio (Kika) De La Garza, II, first Mexican-American to represent his region in the US House and the second Mexican-American from Texas to be elected to Congress (1965–1997).  
 Ray Barnhart, Federal Highway Administrator (1981–1987)
 Anita Lee Blair, first blind woman elected to a state legislature
 Jack Brooks, U.S. House of Representatives (1953–1995)
 Dolph Briscoe, Governor of Texas (1973–1979)
 Frank Kell Cahoon, Midland County oilman and representative from 1965 to 1969; only Republican member in 1965 legislative session
 Joaquin Castro, U.S. Representative (2013–present)
 Tom DeLay, U.S. Representative (1985–2006) and House Majority Leader (2003–2005)
 John Nance Garner, U.S. Representative (1903–1933), Speaker of the House (1931–1933), and Vice President of the United States (1933–1941)
 O.H. "Ike" Harris, Dallas County representative from 1963 to 1965; state senator (1967–1995)
 Sarah T. Hughes, United States district court judge
 Robert Dean Hunter, former executive vice president of the Independent Colleges and Universities of Texas
 Suzanna Hupp, House of Representatives (1997–2007), survived the Luby's shooting, went on to champion individual gun ownership and carry rights.
 Kay Bailey Hutchison, U.S. Senator (1993–2013)
 Ray Hutchison, husband of Kay Bailey Hutchison
 Eddie Bernice Johnson, first Black woman ever elected to public office from Dallas, first woman in Texas history to lead a major Texas House committee (the Labor Committee), and the first registered nurse elected to Congress.
 Samuel Ealy Johnson, Jr., father of President Lyndon B. Johnson (1963-1969)
 Dan Kubiak, representative from Rockdale known for his support of public education
 Mickey Leland, U.S. House of Representatives (1979–1989), died in a plane crash.
 Charles Henry Nimitz (1826–1911) Born in Bremen. In 1852, built the Nimitz Hotel in Fredericksburg, which now houses the National Museum of the Pacific War. Grandfather of United States Fleet Admiral Chester Nimitz. Elected to the Texas Legislature 1890.
 Rick Perry, longest serving Governor of Texas, (2000–2015) and former U.S. Secretary of Energy (2017-2019).
 Colonel Alfred P.C. Petsch (1925–1941) Lawyer, legislator, civic leader, and philanthropist. Veteran of both World War I and World War II.
 Sam Rayburn, U.S. Representative (1913–1961) and longest served Speaker of the House (1940–1947, 1949–1953, 1955–1961)
 Coke R. Stevenson, Governor of Texas (1941–1947)
 Sarah Weddington, attorney for "Jane Roe" for the 1973 Roe v. Wade case in the U.S. Supreme Court
 Ferdinand C. Weinert, coauthored bill to establish the Pasteur Institute of Texas, authored resolution for humane treatment of state convicts, coauthored the indeterminate sentence and parole law. Also served as Texas Secretary of State
 Charles Wilson, U.S. House of Representatives (1973–1996), subject of the book and film Charlie Wilson's War

Officials

Speaker of the House
The Speaker of the House of Representatives has duties as a presiding officer as well as administrative duties. As a presiding officer, the Speaker must enforce, apply, and interpret the rules of the House, call House members to order, lay business in order before the House and receive propositions made by members, refer proposed legislation to a committee, preserve order and decorum, recognize people in the gallery, state and hold votes on questions, vote as a member of the House, decide on all questions to order, appoint the Speaker Pro Tempore and Temporary Chair, adjourn the House in the event of an emergency, postpone reconvening in the event of an emergency, and sign all bills, joint resolutions, and concurrent resolutions. The administrative duties of the Speaker include having control over the Hall of the House, appointing chair, vice-chair, and members to each standing committee, appointing all conference committees, and directing committees to make interim studies.

Chief Clerk
The Chief Clerk is the head of the Chief Clerk's Office which maintains a record of all authors who sign legislation, maintains and distributes membership information to current house members, and forwards copies of legislation to house committee chairs. The Chief Clerk is the primary custodian of all legal documents within House. Additional duties include keeping a record of all progress on a document, attesting all warrants, writs, and subpoenas, receiving and filing all documents received by the house, and maintaining the electronic information and calendar for documents. When there is a considerable update of the electronic source website, the Chief Clerk is also responsible for noticing House members via email.

Committees 
 Agriculture and Livestock
 Appropriations
 Subcommittee on Articles I, IV & V
 Subcommittee on Article II
 Subcommittee on Article III
 Subcommittee on Articles VI, VII & VIII
 Subcommittee on Infrastructure, Resiliency & Invest
 Business & Industry
 Calendars
 Corrections
 County Affairs
 Criminal Jurisprudence
 Culture, Recreation & Tourism
 Defense & Veterans' Affairs
 Elections
 Energy Resources
 Environmental Regulation
 General Investigating
 Higher Education
 Homeland Security & Public Safety
 House Administration
 Human Services
 Insurance
 International Relations & Economic Development
 Judiciary & Civil Jurisprudence
 Juvenile Justice & Family Issues
 Land & Resource Management
 Licensing & Administrative Procedures
 Local & Consent Calendars
 Natural Resources
 Pensions, Investments & Financial Services
 Public Education
 Public Health
 Redistricting
 Resolutions Calendar
 State Affairs
 Transportation
 Urban Affairs
 Ways & Means

In addition to these committees, there are also six joint committees composed of members of both the State House and Senate:

 Criminal Justice Legislative Oversight
 Legislative Audit Board
 Legislative Budget Board
 Legislative Library Board
 Sunset Advisory Commission
 Texas Legislative Council

Past composition

See also

 Thomas Caruthers
 Texas Government Newsletter

Notes

References

External links
 
 District map - Texas Department of Transportation

 
.
State lower houses in the United States